Iván Gutman (born in 1947) is a Serbian chemist and mathematician.

Life and work

Gutman was born in Sombor, Yugoslavia in a Bunjevac family. In 1970 he graduated chemistry from the University of Belgrade where he worked a short time as an assistant at the Chemistry Department. From 1971 until 1976 he worked as Research Assistant and Senior Research Assistant at Ruđer Bošković Institute in Zagreb, Department of Physical Chemistry.
In 1973 he received M.Sc. degree from the University of Zagreb, in the area of theoretical organic chemistry. In the same year he received a doctorate degree in chemistry from the University of Zagreb. His supervisor was Nenad Trinajstić. From 1977 he worked at the University of Kragujevac, eventually becoming a full research professor in 1982. In 1981 he received a doctorate degree in mathematics from the University of Belgrade. From 2012 he is a professor emeritus at the University of Kragujevac.

His research interests are theoretical organic chemistry, physical chemistry, mathematical chemistry, graph theory, spectral graph theory and discrete mathematics. Gutman is known for his work in chemical graph theory and topological descriptors. In mathematics he introduced the notion of graph energy, a concept originating from theoretical chemistry. With Chris Godsil he worked on the theory of the matching polynomial.

He is a full member of the Serbian Academy of Arts and Sciences since 1997. Other memberships include membership in the International Academy of Mathematical Chemistry, the Academy of Nonlinear Sciences (Moscow) and Academia Europaea. Gutman is a collaborator on the Lexicon of Danube Croats for Croatian Academic Society 'HAD' in Subotica.

See also
 Graph energy
 Wiener index
 Caterpillar tree
 Szeged index
 Aleksandar Despić
 Pavle Simić
 Milan Vukcevich
 Bogdan Đuričić
 Ljubisav Rakić
 Ivan Gutman
 Sima Lozanić
 Marko Leko
 Mihailo Rašković
 Zivojin Jocic
 Aleksandar M. Leko
 Milivoje Lozanić
 Dejan Popović Jekić
 Panta Tutundžić
 Vukić Mićović
 Persida Ilić
 Svetozar Lj. Jovanović
 Djordje K. Stefanović

References

Selected publications
 
 
 
 
 
 
 
 
 

1947 births
Living people
Serbian chemists
Serbian mathematicians